Buchanan Township is a township in Page County, Iowa, USA.

Buchanan Township was named in memory of an army officer who drowned there in 1833 while crossing a creek.

References

Page County, Iowa
Townships in Iowa